Stephanie Irene Bice (née Asady; born November 11, 1973) is an American politician serving as the U.S. representative for Oklahoma's 5th congressional district since 2021. A member of the Republican Party, she is the first Iranian American to be elected to Congress. Bice represented the 22nd district in the Oklahoma Senate from 2014 to 2020.

Early life, education, and early career
Bice was born in Oklahoma City to an American mother (Paula Sue Vanhooser, of Dutch heritage) and an Iranian-born father (Hosein "Joe" Asady). Asady came to the United States at a young age to study computer science. He received a BS degree from the University of Central Oklahoma in 1973 and became an American citizen in 1975. Asady is the founder and CEO of a network technology company. 

After graduating from Oklahoma State University with a bachelor's degree in marketing and a minor in international business, Bice worked for eight years in financial oversight, business strategy and marketing for her family's technology company in Oklahoma City. She later helped lead a boutique digital marketing agency in Oklahoma City as vice president of business development.

Oklahoma Senate

Elections
Bice was first elected to the Oklahoma Senate in 2014. She was reelected in 2018 with 73% of the vote in the Republican primary and 68% of the vote in the general election.

Tenure
Bice represented the 22nd district in the Oklahoma Senate from 2014 to 2020. She served on the Subcommittee on General Government and Transportation, and the Business, Commerce & Tourism, Finance, Public Safety committees. In 2016, the Senate Republican Caucus elected Bice Assistant Majority Floor Leader.

Bice was the Senate sponsor of House Bill 1269, a law that provided relief to people who were serving felony prison sentences for crimes that are now misdemeanors. Instead of automatically granting retroactive relief to all eligible inmates, state lawmakers directed the Pardon and Parole Board to establish an accelerated, single-stage commutation docket to review eligible cases.

Bice sponsored SB 142, which required informed consent for nursing home patients and their families regarding the use of powerful antipsychotic drugs. The measure deals with the overuse of powerful antipsychotic drugs for nursing home patients who have not received a psychiatric diagnosis or given informed consent. The measure was signed into law in May 2019.

Bice was a sponsor of State Question 792, which overhauled Oklahoma's liquor laws by allowing grocery stores to sell full point beer and wine.

U.S. House of Representatives

Elections

2020 

In April 2019, Bice announced her candidacy for Oklahoma's 5th congressional district in the 2020 election. The 5th district had been a Republican stronghold for over 40 years until Democrat Kendra Horn was elected in 2018.

In June 2020, Oklahoman.com reported that the Bice campaign sent a mailer including the Oklahomans for Life logo without the organization's permission. Bice said, "I understand Oklahomans for Life wasn't endorsing in this race and wanted to make clear that I am pro-life and have stood with Oklahomans for Life".

Bice placed second in the June 30 Republican primary behind Terry Neese, a businesswoman who was the Republican nominee for lieutenant governor of Oklahoma in 1990. As no candidate won 50% of the vote, Bice and Neese advanced to a runoff. Bice defeated Neese in the runoff and Horn in the general election. She focused her campaign on immigration and affordable healthcare.

Bice is the first Iranian American to be elected to Congress.

2022 

Bice defeated primary challenger Subrina Banks in the Republican primary and Democratic candidate Joshua Harris-Till and Independent David Frosch in the general election.

Tenure 
In late 2020, Bice was identified as a participant in the Freedom Force, a group of incoming Republican members of the House of Representatives who "say they're fighting against socialism in America".

On January 6, 2021, Bice voted to object to Arizona's and Pennsylvania's electoral votes in the 2020 presidential election.

On January 20, the day of Joe Biden's inauguration, Bice was one of 17 newly elected House Republicans to sign a letter congratulating him and expressing hope of bipartisan cooperation.

In March 2021, Bice voted against the American Rescue Plan Act of 2021.

On May 19, 2021, Bice was one of 35 Republicans who joined all Democrats in voting to approve legislation to establish the January 6, 2021 commission meant to investigate the storming of the U.S. Capitol.

Committee assignments 

 House Committee on Armed Services
 Military Personnel Subcommittee
 Cyber, Innovative Technologies, and Information Systems Subcommittee
 House Committee on Science, Space and Technology
 Environment Subcommittee (Ranking Member)

Personal life
Bice graduated from Putnam City High School in Oklahoma. She married Geoffrey Bice in 1996. They have two daughters and live in Edmond, Oklahoma. Bice is Catholic and attends St. Eugene Catholic Church in Oklahoma City.

Electoral history

2022 congressional election

2020 congressional election

2018 Oklahoma Senate election

2014 Oklahoma Senate election
Bice was unopposed in the 2014 general election.

See also
Women in the United States House of Representatives
List of Arab and Middle Eastern Americans in the United States Congress

References

External links
 Representative Stephanie Bice official U.S. House website
 Campaign website
 
 

|-

1973 births
21st-century American businesspeople
21st-century American businesswomen
21st-century American politicians
21st-century American women politicians
American people of Dutch descent
American politicians of Iranian descent
American Roman Catholics
American technology businesspeople
Businesspeople from Oklahoma City
Catholics from Oklahoma
Female members of the United States House of Representatives
Living people
Republican Party Oklahoma state senators
Oklahoma State University alumni
Politicians from Oklahoma City
Republican Party members of the United States House of Representatives from Oklahoma
Women state legislators in Oklahoma